Abu al-Khaṭṭāb ʻAbd al-Ḥamīd ibn ʻAbd al-Majīd, commonly known as Al-Akhfash al-Akbar was an Arab grammarian who lived in Basra and associated with the method of Arabic grammar of its linguists, and was a client of the Qais tribe.

His most notable students were: Sibawayh, Yunus ibn Habib, Abu ʿUbaidah, Abu Zayd al-Ansari and Al-Asma'i. Al-Akhfash revised his student Sibawayh's famous Kitab, the first book ever written on Arabic grammar, and was responsible for circulating the first manuscripts after his student's untimely death. Al-Akhfash was also one of the first linguists to contribute significantly to commentary and analysis of Arabic poetry. Additionally, he contributed to Arabic philology as well as lexicography, recording vocabulary and expressions of the Bedouin tribes which had not previously been recorded.

References 

793 deaths
Arab grammarians
Medieval grammarians of Arabic
Year of birth unknown
8th-century Arabs